Mooresville High School may refer to:

Mooresville High School (Indiana), in Mooresville, Indiana
Mooresville High School (North Carolina), in Mooresville, North Carolina